State Highway 45 (SH 45), also known as Pueblo Boulevard, is an expressway in the city of Pueblo. Plans are waiting to be approved to expand the expressway to six lanes, build a new interchange with US 50, and fix lane narrowing.

Route description
The route begins at I-25. It traverses just south of Lake Minnequa and the Minnequa Business District in southern Pueblo. It intersects SH 78 and SH 96. The route then continues, intersecting several other city streets. The road comes to an end at US 50. The street continues northwest as Wildhorse Road in Pueblo West.

History
The route started as a rural highway in the 1960s, with the first section from I-25 northwest to SH 96 opening by 1966. By 1973, it was extended north to 11th Street, and was completed north to US 50 by 1975.

Future
Because of growing population in Pueblo, especially in the western side around SH 96, an extension of Highway 45 into a major highway in the area has been proposed.  In theory, it would be useful to alleviate traffic jams in the area. SH 45 is planned to eventually continue northeast from US 50 to I-25 around Milepost 103.

Major intersections

References

External links

045
Transportation in Pueblo County, Colorado
Pueblo, Colorado